Ida E. Woods (September 16, 1870 – October 4, 1940) was an American astronomer at Harvard College Observatory.

Early life 
Ida Elizabeth Woods was born in Natick, Massachusetts, the daughter of Oliver Powers Woods and Martha Wright Woods. She graduated from Wellesley College in 1893.

Career 
As a "computer" at Harvard College Observatory, beginning immediately after college in 1893, Woods worked with Harlow Shapley and Annie Jump Cannon. She studied photographic plates to discover dozens of variable stars during her career. She attended the meeting of the American Association of Variable Star Observers (AAVSO) in 1916, when it was held at Harvard.

Publications by Woods included "Light Curve and Orbit of a New Eclipsing Binary H. V. 3622" (1922), "Fifty New Variable Stars in the Southern Milky Way" (1926), "The Southern Station of the Harvard Observatory" (1927), and "Forty New Variable Stars in Sagitarrius" (1928).

She held the Sarah F. Whitin Fellowship from Wellesley in 1912, to fund her research at Harvard. She was a member of the Sagamore Sociological Conference.

Personal life 
Woods died in 1940, at her home in Natick. She was 70 years old.

References

External links 

 

1870 births
1940 deaths
American women astronomers
Wellesley College alumni
People from Natick, Massachusetts
19th-century American astronomers
19th-century American women scientists
20th-century American astronomers
20th-century American women scientists
Scientists from Massachusetts